Vijaya Manikya II ( – 1563), also spelt Vijay or Bijoy, was the Maharaja of Tripura from 1532 to 1563. Succeeding to the throne at a young age, Vijaya proved himself to be a formidable military leader, initiating a series of conquests into several surrounding kingdoms, including the powerful Bengal Sultanate. During Vijaya's reign, the might and influence of Tripura reached its  zenith, leading to him being viewed as one of its greatest monarchs.

Early life
Vijaya was born the son of Deva Manikya, himself the son of the famous Dhanya Manikya. When he was a child, Vijaya's father was assassinated in a conspiracy orchestrated by the Brahman Lakshminarayana and one of Deva's queens, who placed the latter's son, Indra Manikya I, on the throne. Vijaya himself was imprisoned, though was later freed by the commander of the army, Daityanarayana, who named him king in 1532 after having Lakshminarayana killed.

According to the Rajmala, Vijaya was initially under the protection of the commander, whose daughter he was married to. However, the young king began to chafe under the thumb of his father-in-law, who held the actual control of the kingdom and used Vijaya as a puppet-monarch. The Rajmala continues that in response, Vijaya had Daityanarayana killed. However, there is some evidence that the text had conflicted details regarding Vijaya with that of an earlier monarch, Vijaya Manikya I, who was also controlled by a military leader with the name Daityanarayana.

Military expansion
Vijaya's reign is viewed to have heralded a new era in the history of medieval Tripura. The death of Daityanarayana curtailed the tremendous influence of the army chiefs in the kingdom's administration, allowing Vijaya to consolidate executive power in his own person. He was thus freed to focus his full powers in achieving his considerable military ambitions.

Great efforts were implemented in modernising the kingdom's army and strengthening its influence. Archers, elephants, artillery and a navy were organised and incorporated into its ranks, while military camps were established at Tripura's frontiers to better defend its sovereignty. In line with trends occurring throughout the Indian subcontinent, cavalries became an intrinsic part of the army during Vijaya's reign, being established with the aid of Afghan soldiers. Chronicles state that these reforms resulted in a formidable military composed of 200,000 infantry, 10,000 cavalry, 1000 elephants and 5000 boats.

This realisation of Tripura's military might allowed a period of aggressive territorial conquests to be initiated, resulting in the extensive expansion of lands under Vijaya's control. The regions of Sylhet and Jaintia were conquered and incorporated into the kingdom, the ruler of Khasiya voluntarily submitted to Tripuri suzerainty and Chittagong was recaptured from the Afghan rulers of Bengal.

However, as a result of the defeats inflicted by Vijaya on their countrymen, the Afghans in his army revolted, with 1000 Pathan horsemen marching on Chittagong. The rebels were soon captured and Vijaya had them sacrificed at the altar of the Fourteen Gods. The Sultan of Bengal, who may have been disturbed by the deaths or was perhaps attempting to take advantage of the distraction provided by the rebellion, launched an invasion of Tripura. 10,000 foot soldiers and 3000 cavalry assaulted the kingdom, resulting in a protracted eight-month conflict in Chittagong. However, Tripura emerged victorious, with the Bengali commander also being sacrificed to the gods.

Vijaya launched a counter assault, with his armies raiding deep into east Bengal. He himself commanded his 5000 riverboats down the Brahmaputra River to the Padma, occupying Bikrampur and having Sonargaon plundered and burned. The Sultan, having been distracted by an internecine war with the Mughal Empire, was unable to oppose Vijaya, leaving the latter the unrivalled master of the region.

Interactions with contemporary rulers
Vijaya was a contemporary of the Mughal emperor Akbar, with him finding mention in the Ain-i-Akbari. He maintained relations with Mukunda Deva, the ruler of Odisha, to whom he entrusted the care of his elder son Dungar Fa. It is possible that an alliance had existed between these two kings in opposition to the Sultans of Bengal. He also interacted with the ruler of the Kachari Kingdom, through whose intercession Vijaya spared the king of Jaintia when the latter initially refused to submit to his authority.

In the Darrang Raj Vamsavali, a Koch royal chronicle, the Koch king Nara Narayan and his brother Chilarai are claimed to have invaded Tripura around the time of Vijaya's reign, inflicting a devastating defeat on its ruler. However, it is unlikely that this ruler can be identified with Vijaya himself, given that it is implausible that such a powerful monarch would have suffered so great a loss. Given that it finds no mention in Tripuri sources, it is instead believed that the defeat had been exaggerated or that it had occurred under Vijaya's successor.

Death
In 1563, Vijaya died of smallpox at the age of forty-seven, having reigned for more than thirty years. As was custom, his wives performed Sati, following his body into the funeral pyre. At the time of his death, Tripura had reached its greatest extent, controlling the entirety of eastern Bengal as well as the southern portion of the present-day Indian state of Assam. Vijaya's successes are acknowledged in the Rajmala, which describes him in the following manner:

He was succeeded by his son Ananta Manikya, who proved to be less able than his father. Tripura subsequently experienced a period of gradual decay.

Notes

References

Bibliography

Kings of Tripura
History of Tripura
Bengal Sultanate
Deaths from smallpox
1563 deaths